The 2006 Open 13 was an ATP men's tennis tournament played on indoor hard courts in Marseille, France that was part of the International Series of the 2006 ATP Tour. It was the 14th edition of the tournament and was held from 13 February until 20 February 2006. Unseeded Arnaud Clément, who entered the main draw on a wildcard, won the singles title.

Finals

Singles

 Arnaud Clément defeated  Mario Ančić 6–4, 6–2
 It was Clément's 1st title of the year and the 8th of his career.

Doubles

 Martin Damm /  Radek Štěpánek defeated  Mark Knowles /  Daniel Nestor 6–2, 6–7(4–7), [10–3]
 It was Damm's 1st title of the year and the 32nd of his career. It was Štěpánek's 1st title of the year and the 12th of his career.

References

External links
 ITF tournament edition details

 
Open 13
Open 13
Open 13